Naim Terbunja (born 28 September 1984 in Pristina, Yugoslavia – in present-day Kosovo) is a Swedish professional boxer of Kosovar-Albanian descent who qualified for the 2008 Olympics at middleweight.

Terbunja lost his round of 32 match against Matvey Korobov 18 points to 6.

Terbunja captured the prestigious National Golden Gloves championship in Salt Lake City, winning five bouts in seven days. Capping that stretch, he defeated the top-ranked fighter in the country - Luis Arias of Wisconsin - 3-2, in the finals of the 165-pound division

Professional boxing record

Notes

External links
 Qualifier
 sports-reference
 http://www.nydailynews.com/sports/more_sports/2009/05/10/2009-05-10_naim_terbunja_is_at_nationals.html#ixzz0dsXuM8YI
 https://fightnews.com/bounce-weights-from-las-vegas/21296

Living people
Olympic boxers of Sweden
Boxers at the 2008 Summer Olympics
Middleweight boxers
Sportspeople from Pristina
Kosovan emigrants to Sweden
Swedish people of Kosovan descent
Swedish people of Albanian descent
1984 births
Kosovan expatriate sportspeople in Sweden
Swedish male boxers
Djurgårdens IF boxers